Love Undercover (新紮師妹) is a 2002 Hong Kong film directed by Joe Ma Wai-Ho.

The film was followed by two sequels, also directed by Joe Ma: Love Undercover 2: Love Mission (2003) and Love Undercover 3 (2006).

Cast
 Miriam Yeung - Fong Lai Kuen
 Daniel Wu - Au Hoi Man
 Benz Hui - Officer Chung
 Wyman Wong - Roger
 Sammy Leung - Over
 Cha Siu-Yan - Madame Cha
 Chow Chung - Au Yiu San
 Matt Chow	
 Joe Lee Yiu-ming - Chuen
 Lee Siu-kei - FBI officer
 Alan Mak
 Ng Chi Hung - FBI officer
 Wong Ho-Yin - Hung Chow
 Wong Yat Tung	
 Wilson Yip

External links
 
 HK Cinemagic entry

2002 films
2000s Cantonese-language films
2002 romantic comedy films
Films directed by Joe Ma
Hong Kong romantic comedy films
2000s Hong Kong films